The Men's Discus Throw event at the 2009 World Championships in Athletics was held at the Olympic Stadium on August 18 and August 19.

As the only man to throw in excess of seventy metres that season, reigning world and Olympic champion Gerd Kanter of Estonia was the event favourite. Veteran athlete Virgilijus Alekna, the last athlete to beat Kanter in competition, was a strong medal possibility. Olympic silver medallist Piotr Malachowski was another contender, as was German Robert Harting who won silver at the previous world championships. The season had been of a high standard, with a number of athletes throwing over 65 m, including Frank Casañas, Bogdan Pishchalnikov and Zoltán Kővágó.

On the first day of competition, qualification went smoothly as many of the highest ranked athletes qualified for the final on their first throw, with seven of them passing the automatic qualification mark of 64.50 m. Casañas and Estonia's number two Aleksander Tammert were the only high-profile athletes to be eliminated. Home competitor Harting had the best throw of the day (66.81), and Kővágó and Kanter were the next best qualifiers.

In the final, Malachowski and Harting started very well on their first throws, with the former taking the lead with a Polish record-breaking throw, while the latter recorded a season's best. The pre-event favourites Kanter and Alekna were unable to challenge the two, as the Estonian took the bronze with his fourth round throw of 66.88 m and the Lithuanian never bettered his first throw of the day (66.36 m) and finished up in fourth place. Consistently throwing better than the rest of the field, Harting and Malachowski battled for the top spot. The Pole improved his lead with 69.15 m in the fifth round, another national record, but Harting took the gold with his final throw of the competition, recording a personal best of 69.43 m.

The victory for the home athlete was marred by his controversial comments regarding an initiative by victims of doping in East Germany. Former East German athletes, who had suffered through the state-sponsored doping program in the 1980s, were distributing glasses outside the stadium to encourage people not to "turn a blind eye" to doping. Harting said that he wished his discus would bounce from the ground and hit wearers in the eyes, but he later retracted and apologise for his statement.

Medallists

Records

Qualification standards

Schedule

Results

Qualification
Qualification: Qualifying Performance 64.50 (Q) or at least 12 best performers (q) advance to the final.

Final

Key:  PB = Personal best, NR = National record

References
General
Discus throw results. IAAF. Retrieved on 2009-08-18.
Specific

Discus throw
Discus throw at the World Athletics Championships